The 85th Air Division is an inactive United States Air Force unit. Its last assignment was with Eastern Air Defense Force of Air Defense Command at Andrews Air Force Base, Maryland. It was inactivated on 1 September 1958.

History
During World War II, the 85th Fighter Wing was a command and control organization of Fifth Air Force, operating primarily in the Southwest Pacific Theater. It had no units assigned before departing overseas from California. In the Southwest Pacific Area its units fought in "New Guinea and the Philippine Islands (February 1944 – August 1945) [flying] cover missions for convoys, patrols, escorted bombers, attacked enemy airfields, and support[ing] ground forces."

"After the war's end, the organization provided fighter protection for the Philippine Islands and conducted an intensive training program in aerial combat, gunnery, and instrument flying, until [the units inactivation in] June 1948."

During the Cold War the unit was reactivated as an Air Division by Air Defense Command. "It was assigned to the Eastern Air Defense Force in September 1955 with a mission to intercept unidentified aircraft over the Washington, D.C. area. It participated in numerous training exercises. It also took part in gunnery and air-launched training and readiness tests." Inactivated in September 1958.

Lineage
 Established as the 85th Fighter Wing on 4 November 1943
 Activated on 10 November 1943
 Inactivated on 30 June 1948
 Redesignated 85 Air Division (Defense) on 3 May 1955
 Activated on 8 September 1955
 Inactivated on 1 September 1958

Assignments
 Fourth Air Force, 10 November 1943
 IV Fighter Command, 28 November 1943 – 10 January 1944
 Army Service Forces, Port of Embarkation, 10 January – 17 February 1944
 Fifth Air Force, 18 February 1944
 Far East Air Forces, 11 May 1945
 Thirteenth Air Force, 1 September 1945
 Fifth Air Force, 1 June 1947 – 30 June 1948
 Eastern Air Defense Force, 8 September 1955 – 1 September 1958

Stations

 Hamilton Field, California, 10 November 1943
 San Francisco Airport, California, 10 November 1943 – 10 January 1944
 Gusap Airfield, New Guinea, 25 February 1944
 Hollandia Airfield Complex, New Guinea, 24 July 1944
 Bayug Airfield, Leyte, Philippines, 24 October 1944

 Fort William McKinley, Luzon, Philippines, c. 15 June 1945
 Basa Air Base, Luzon, Philippines, c. 15 July 1946
 Nagoya Airfield, Japan, 1 June 1947 – 30 June 1948
 Andrews Air Force Base, Maryland, 8 September 1955 – 1 September 1958

Components
Wing
 4625th Air Defense Wing (later Washington Air Defense Sector): 1 December 1956 – 1 September 1958

Groups
 18th Fighter Group: 15 March 1946 – 1 May 1947
 49th Fighter Group: 19 April – 5 June 1944
 348th Fighter Group: 7 November 1944 – 8 February 1945
 414th Fighter Group: c. 15 December 1945-c. 30 September 1946
 475th Fighter Group: 16 June 1944 – 18 May 1945

Squadrons
 17th Photographic Reconnaissance Squadron: 1 February – 22 March 1946
 48th Fighter-Interceptor Squadron: 1 March 1956 – 1 September 1958
 95th Fighter-Interceptor Squadron: 1 March 1956 – 1 September 1958
 419th Night Fighter Squadron: 10 January 1946 – 20 February 1947
 482d Fighter-Interceptor Squadron: 8 April 1956 – 1 September 1958
 550th Night Fighter Squadron: 7 April-c. 30 June 1945

See also
 List of USAF Aerospace Defense Command General Surveillance Radar Stations
 Aerospace Defense Command Fighter Squadrons
 List of United States Air Force air divisions

References

Notes
 Explanatory notes

 Citations

Bibliography

 
 
 
 

085
Aerospace Defense Command units
1943 establishments in California
1958 disestablishments in Maryland